Plasmodium garnhami is a parasite of the genus Plasmodium.

Like all Plasmodium species, P. garnhami has both vertebrate and insect hosts. The vertebrate hosts for this parasite are birds.

Description 

The parasite was first described by Guindy et al. in 1965.

Geographical occurrence 

This species is found in Egypt.

Clinical features and host pathology 

Host species include the hoopoe (Upupa epops) and the rain quail (Coturnix coromandelica).

References 

garnhami
Parasites of birds